American comedian, television host, and writer Stephen Colbert is widely known for using nicknames to refer to different people, especially American politicians, in his television programs. In 2017, Esquire described the writers of The Late Show with Stephen Colbert as "the best in the game at coming up with fake titles that follow real titles".

Domestic political figures

Other people

Groups of people

Miscellaneous

See also
Lists of nicknames

References

Nicknames
Colbert